The 2010 Clemson Tigers baseball team represented Clemson University in the 2010 NCAA Division I baseball season. The team played their home games at Doug Kingsmore Stadium in Clemson, South Carolina.

The team was coached by Jack Leggett, who completed his seventeenth season at Clemson.

Preseason 
On January 28, 2010, the coaches in the ACC picked Clemson to finish second in the Atlantic Division behind Florida State. Overall, the Tigers were picked third behind defending ACC champion Virginia and Florida State, respectively.

Regular season 
Clemson played Wright State and Dayton for the first time ever on the baseball diamond. The Tigers went 4–0 against the Dayton, Ohio schools, sweeping Wright State in a three-game series before winning a mid-week contest against Dayton in 10 innings.

Clemson won its annual series against archrival South Carolina for the first time since 2006 by taking two of three games against the Gamecocks. OF/DH Chris Epps won the Bob Bradley Award as the Tigers' MVP of the series, going 7-for-14 with two home runs, a double, six RBIs, six runs, two walks, and one steal. The March 6 contest at Fluor Field was the first game between both schools at that stadium and the 1st game played in Greenville since the 1990 season.

On April 21, 3B John Hinson tied a school record by hitting three home runs in a game during the Tigers' 22–4 victory over USC-Upstate.

Clemson played its first four-game weekend series since 1996 when they hosted Florida Gulf Coast, the first meeting between the schools. After dropping the first game in the series, the Tigers took the final three games from the Eagles.

On May 22, Clemson completed a three-game sweep of eventual ACC champion Florida State to win their second ACC Atlantic Division title. Both teams finished with an 18–12 conference record, but the Tigers won the tiebreaker due to winning the head-to-head matchup with the Seminoles.

Clemson played nine schools that made it to the 2010 NCAA tournament: (Coastal Carolina, Elon, Florida State, Georgia Tech, North Carolina State, North Carolina, South Carolina, Virginia, Virginia Tech). The Tigers compiled a 14–13 record against these 9 schools. Outside of conference play, Clemson played 4 schools that had won a conference regular season or tournament championship (Charlotte, Coastal Carolina, Florida Gulf Coast, Wright State). The Tigers compiled a 6–3 record against these four schools.

Postseason

ACC tournament 
Clemson entered the ACC Tournament as the #2 seed by virtue of winning the ACC Atlantic Division (Virginia claimed the #1 seed by virtue of winning both the Coastal Division and the ACC regular season). The Tigers competed in the Pool B of round robin play, which included #3 seed Georgia Tech, #6 seed Virginia Tech, and #7 seed N.C. State. The Tigers dropped their first two games against the Wolfpack and Hokies (both were teams that the Tigers swept in the regular season) before winning their final game against the Yellow Jackets (who swept the Tigers during the regular season) to finish the tournament with a 1–2 record. Florida State, whom the Tigers swept to win the Atlantic Division crown, defeated N.C. State in the championship game to win the ACC Championship.

With their victory over Georgia Tech, Clemson became the first team to win 100 games in ACC Tournament history.

NCAA tournament 
Clemson was awarded the #2 seed in the Auburn Regional of the 2010 NCAA tournament. On June 4, the Tigers opened regional play with #3 seed and Conference USA champion Southern Miss. The Tigers totaled 12 hits and used 6 runs in the sixth inning to top the Golden Eagles, 10–1. On June 5, Clemson faced #1 seed and host Auburn in a match-up of conference division champions (Clemson having won the ACC Atlantic title, while Auburn won the SEC West title). The ACC Tigers prevailed over the SEC Tigers, 5–2, behind a complete game performance by pitcher Casey Harman. The following night, however, Auburn won 11–10, using a three-run home run by Creede Simpson in the 9th inning to rally past Clemson and force a deciding championship game. On June 7, Clemson prevailed, using clutch hitting and timely plays on defense to defeat Auburn, 13–7, and win the Auburn Regional Championship. In the 1st inning of the championship game, two-sport standout Kyle Parker hit his 20th home run of the season, becoming the 1st Division I athlete to throw 20 touchdown passes in football and hit 20 home runs in baseball in the same academic year.

Clemson was named one of the eight schools to host a Super Regional, as the Tigers were paired up against Atlanta Regional champions, Alabama. The Crismon Tide knocked off #8 national seed (and Tiger ACC rival) Georgia Tech, which gave the Tigers the opportunity to receive its 1st super regional bid since 2006. In the 1st game of the super regional, the Crimson Tide used two errors in the 3rd inning to score 4 runs and jump out to a 5–0 lead, then held on to claim a 5–4 victory over the Tigers. In the 2nd super regional game, however, the Tigers jumped out to a 6–0 lead and never looked back, tallying 20 hits and 9 walks against Alabama's pitching staff in a 19–5 victory to force a deciding game 3 for a CWS berth. In game three, Clemson erased an early 1–0 deficit to take an 8–1 lead into the ninth inning and held of an Alabama rally to win 8–6 and earn a College World Series bid, the Tigers' eleventh overall and first since 2006.

College World Series 
By virtue of the Super Regional win against Alabama, Clemson joined Arizona State, Florida, Florida State, Oklahoma, South Carolina, TCU, and UCLA in the 2010 College World Series. Clemson was the only team to advance to the CWS that was ranked lower than a #1 seed during regional play. On June 21, the Tigers defeated #1 national seed Arizona State, 6–3, in a game that was delayed to a 10:00 A.M. (CST) start time due to rain and lightning the previous evening. The Tigers used strong pitching performances by Casey Harman and Alex Frederick, along with great play on defense, to hold the Sun Devils to only three runs. Offensively, the Tigers took advantage of a poor outing by ASU starting pitcher Scott Blair and several defensive miscues en route to scoring 6 runs and totaling 14 hits. On June 22, the Tigers played the Oklahoma Sooners. They secured a 6–1 lead after 5 innings against the Sooners before play was stopped at 10:08 P.M. (CST) due to inclement weather. The game was resumed the following afternoon, with Clemson holding off a late Sooner rally to win 6–4. Clemson then went on to face in state rival South Carolina, dropping the next two games to the Gamecocks 5–1 and 6–4 to be eliminated from the tournament. South Carolina ultimately went on to win the tournament by beating UCLA twice in the finals.

Honors and awards 
All-ACC 1st Team
 Kyle Parker (OF)

All-ACC 2nd Team
 Mike Freeman (2B)
 Jeff Schaus (OF)

Auburn Regional All-Tournament Team
 Wilson Boyd (OF)
 Mike Freeman (2B)
 Casey Harman (P)
 John Hinson (3B) – MVP
 Jeff Schaus (OF)
 Scott Weisman (P)

Coaching staff

Schedule/Results 

|- align="left" bgcolor="#ddffdd"
| February  19* || Miami, Ohio, || style="text-align:center;" | #15 || Doug Kingsmore Stadium • Clemson, South Carolina, || Harman (1–0) || Melling (0–1) ||  || style="text-align:center;" | 5,915 || W 11–0 || 1–0
|- align="left" bgcolor="#ddffdd"
| February  20* || vs. Michigan State || style="text-align:center;" | #15 || Fluor Field at the West End • Greenville, South Carolina, || Weismann (1–0) || Bucciferro (0–1) ||  || style="text-align:center;" | 3,563 || W 10–2 || 2–0
|- align="left" bgcolor="#ddffdd"
| February  21* || Furman || style="text-align:center;" | #15 || Doug Kingsmore Stadium • Clemson, South Carolina || Brady (1–0) || Benton (0–1) || Meyer (1) || style="text-align:center;" | 5,539 || W 8–5 || 3–0
|- align="left" bgcolor="#ddffdd"
| February  26* || Wright State || style="text-align:center;" | #15 || Doug Kingsmore Stadium • Clemson, South Carolina || Harman (2–0) || Kaminsky (0–1) || Frederick (1) || style="text-align:center;" | 3,884 || W 4–3 || 4–0
|- align="left" bgcolor="#ddffdd"
| February  27* || Wright State || style="text-align:center;" | #15 || Doug Kingsmore Stadium • Clemson, South Carolina || Haselden (1–0) || Schum (0–1) ||  || style="text-align:center;" | 4,690 || W 8–6 || 5–0
|- align="left" bgcolor="#ddffdd"
| February  28* || Wright State || style="text-align:center;" | #15 || Doug Kingsmore Stadium • Clemson, South Carolina || Lamb (1–0) || Friedman (0–1) ||  || style="text-align:center;" | 4,027 || W 12–6 || 6–0
|- align="left" bgcolor="#ddffdd"
| March  3* || Dayton || style="text-align:center;" | #9 || Doug Kingsmore Stadium • Clemson, South Carolina || Cruz (1–0) || Mitchem (0–3) ||  || style="text-align:center;" | 3,268 || W 6–510 || 7–0
|- align="left" bgcolor="#ddffdd"
| March  5* || #23 South Carolina || style="text-align:center;" | #9 || Doug Kingsmore Stadium • Clemson, South Carolina(Clemson–South Carolina rivalry) || Haselden (2–0) || Roth (0–1) ||  || style="text-align:center;" | 6,346 || W 4–3 || 8–0
|- align="left" bgcolor="#ffdddd"
| March  6* || vs. #23 South Carolina || style="text-align:center;" | #9 || Fluor Field at the West End • Greenville, South Carolina(Clemson–South Carolina rivalry) || Price (1–0) || Cruz (1–1) || Roth (1) || style="text-align:center;" | 7,105 || L 5–7 || 8–1
|- align="left" bgcolor="#ddffdd"
| March  7* || @ #23 South Carolina || style="text-align:center;" | #9 || Carolina Stadium • Columbia, South Carolina(Clemson–South Carolina rivalry) || Weismann (2–0) || Webb (0–1) ||  || style="text-align:center;" | 8,214 || W 19–6 || 9–1
|- align="left" bgcolor="#ddffdd"
| March  10* || Gardner–Webb || style="text-align:center;" | #7 || Doug Kingsmore Stadium • Clemson, South Carolina || Sarratt (1–0) || Scarborough (0–2) ||  || style="text-align:center;" | 3,111 || W 13–2 || 10–1
|- align="left" bgcolor="#ddffdd"
| rowspan=2| March  13 || NC State || style="text-align:center;" | #7 || Doug Kingsmore Stadium • Clemson, South Carolina || Harman (3–0) || Mazzoni (2–1) ||  || rowspan=2 style="text-align:center;"| 4,895 || W 12–7 || 11–1 (1–0)
|- align="left" bgcolor="#ddffdd"
| NC State || style="text-align:center;" | #7 || Doug Kingsmore Stadium • Clemson, South Carolina || Leone (1–0) || Tzamtzis (1–1) ||  || W 12–6 || 12–1 (2–0)
|- align="left" bgcolor="#ddffdd"
| March  14 || NC State || style="text-align:center;" | #7 || Doug Kingsmore Stadium • Clemson, South Carolina || Meyer (1–0) || Sasser (2–1) ||  || style="text-align:center;" | 3,663 || W 7–6 || 13–1 (3–0)
|- align="left" bgcolor="#ffdddd"
| March  16* || @ Charlotte || style="text-align:center;" | #7 || Hayes Stadium • Charlotte, North Carolina, || Lawson (1–0) || Cruz (1–2) ||  || style="text-align:center;" | 1,832 || L 10–11 || 13–2
|- align="left" bgcolor="#ddffdd"
| March  17* || Georgia Southern || style="text-align:center;" | #7 || Doug Kingsmore Stadium • Clemson, South Carolina || Kent (1–0) || Beck (0–3) ||  || style="text-align:center;" | 3,409 || W 22–6 || 14–2
|- align="left" bgcolor="#ddffdd"
| March  19 || Virginia Tech  || style="text-align:center;" | #7 || Doug Kingsmore Stadium • Clemson, South Carolina || Harman (4–0) || Wright (2–3) || Haselden (1) || style="text-align:center;" | 3,862 || W 3–0 || 15–2 (4–0)
|- align="left" bgcolor="#ddffdd"
| rowspan=2| March  20 || Virginia Tech || style="text-align:center;" | #7 || Doug Kingsmore Stadium • Clemson, South Carolina || Lamb (2–0) || Hahn (4–1) || Frederick (2) || rowspan=2 style="text-align:center;"| 5,580 || W 5–2 || 16–2 (5–0)
|- align="left" bgcolor="#ddffdd"
| Virginia Tech || style="text-align:center;" | #7 || Doug Kingsmore Stadium • Clemson, South Carolina || Weisman (3–0) || Mantiply || Meyer (2) || W 13–8 || 17–2 (6–0)
|- align="left" bgcolor="#ffdddd"
| March  23* || Elon || style="text-align:center;" | #5 || Doug Kingsmore Stadium • Clemson, South Carolina || Ferrer (2–1) || Firth (0–1) ||  || style="text-align:center;" | 3,496 || L 10–15 || 17–3
|- align="left" bgcolor="#ffdddd"
| March  24* || Elon || style="text-align:center;" | #5 || Doug Kingsmore Stadium • Clemson, South Carolina || Girdwood (2–0) || Meyer (1–1) ||  || style="text-align:center;" | 3,851 || L3–410 || 17–4
|- align="left" bgcolor="#ffdddd"
| March  26 || @ #2 Virginia || style="text-align:center;" | #5 || Davenport Field • Charlottesville, Virginia, || Wilson (3–1) || Haselden (2–1) ||  || style="text-align:center;" | 2,305 || L 3–4 || 17–5 (6–1)
|- align="left" bgcolor="#ddffdd"
| rowspan=2|March  27 || @ #2 Virginia || style="text-align:center;" | #5 || Davenport Field • Charlottesville, Virginia || Lamb (3–0) || Mayberry (0–1) || Haselden (2) || style="text-align:center;" | 3,540 || W 8–5 || 18–5 (7–1)
|- align="left" bgcolor="#ffdddd"
| @ #2 Virginia || style="text-align:center;" | #5 || Davenport Field • Charlottesville, Virginia || Winiarski (3–0) || Weisman (3–1) || Arico (8) || style="text-align:center;" | 3,012 || L 1–3 || 18–6 (7–2)
|- align="left"  bgcolor="#ffdddd"
| March  31* || #15 Coastal Carolina || #10 || Doug Kingsmore Stadium • Clemson, South Carolina || Fleet (3–1) || Haselden (2–2) ||  || style="text-align:center;" | 5,609 || L 3–411 || 18–7
|- align="left" bgcolor="#ddffdd"
| April  2 || Boston College || #10 || Doug Kingsmore Stadium • Clemson, South Carolina || Harman (5–0) || Dennhardt (1–5) || Cruz (1) || style="text-align:center;" | 6,064 || W 15–2 || 19–7 (8–2)
|- align="left" bgcolor="#ffdddd"
| April  3 || Boston College || #10 || Doug Kingsmore Stadium • Clemson, South Carolina || Dean (5–0) || Lamb (3–1) ||  || style="text-align:center;" | 5,587 || L 5–11 || 19–8 (8–3)
|- align="left" bgcolor="#ddffdd"
| April  4 || Boston College || #10 || Doug Kingsmore Stadium • Clemson, South Carolina || Haselden (3–2) || Moran (2–4) ||  || style="text-align:center;" | 3,925 || W 14–9 || 20–8 (9–3)
|- align="left" bgcolor="#ddffdd"
| April  6* || @ Georgia || #11 || Foley Field • Athens, Georgia, || Leone (2–0) || Swegman (0–2) ||  || style="text-align:center;" | 3,783 || W 15–5 || 21–8
|- align="left" bgcolor="#ddffdd"
| April  7* || Georgia || #11 || Doug Kingsmore Stadium • Clemson, South Carolina || Meyer (2–1) || Hawkins (0–2) ||  || style="text-align:center;" | 6,346 || W 14–6 || 22–8
|- align="left" bgcolor="#ffdddd"
| April  9 || @ Duke || #11 || Jack Coombs Field • Durham, North Carolina, || Knott (2–0) || Frederick (0–1) || Stroman (3) || style="text-align:center;" | 788 || L 9–10 || 22–9 (9–4)
|- align="left" bgcolor="#ddffdd"
| April  10 || @ Duke || #11 || Jack Coombs Field • Durham, North Carolina || Cruz (2–2) || Knott (2–1) ||  || style="text-align:center;" | 1,418 || W 11–511 || 23–9 (10–4)
|- align="left" bgcolor="#ffdddd"
| April  11 || @ Duke || #11 || Jack Coombs Field • Durham, North Carolina || Bebout (4–0) || Lamb (3–2) ||  || style="text-align:center;" | 819 || L 2–7 || 23–10 (10–5)
|- align="left" bgcolor="#ffdddd"
| April  14* || Western Carolina || #16 || Doug Kingsmore Stadium • Clemson, South Carolina || Chilcoat (1–0) || Kent (1–1) || Ottone (7) || style="text-align:center;" | 3,990 || L 5–7 || 23–11
|- align="left" bgcolor="#ffdddd"
| April  16 || @ #5 Georgia Tech  || #16 || Russ Chandler Stadium • Atlanta || Robinson (4–0) || Haselden (3–3) ||  || style="text-align:center;" | 2,448 || L 6–810 || 23–12 (10–6)
|- align="left" bgcolor="#ffdddd"
| April  17 || @ #5 Georgia Tech || #16 || Russ Chandler Stadium • Atlanta, Georgia || Cumpton (6–0) || Weisman (3–2) || Robinson (3) || style="text-align:center;" | 2,491 || L 3–4 || 23–13 (10–7)
|- align="left" bgcolor="#ffdddd"
| April  18 || @ #5 Georgia Tech || #16 || Russ Chandler Stadium • Atlanta, Georgia || Bailey (5–2) || Lamb (3–3) ||  || style="text-align:center;" | 2,687 || L 3–11 || 23–14 (10–8)
|- align="left" bgcolor="#ddffdd"
| April  21* || USC-Upstate || #20 || Doug Kingsmore Stadium • Clemson, South Carolina || Haselden (4–3) || Brannon (2–7) ||  || style="text-align:center;" | 3,752 || W 22–4 || 24–14
|- align="left" bgcolor="#ffdddd"
| April  23 || North Carolina || #20 || Doug Kingsmore Stadium • Clemson, South Carolina || Harvey (5–2) || Harman (5–1) ||  || style="text-align:center;" | 5,391 || L 3–5 || 24–15 (10–9)
|- align="left" bgcolor="#ddffdd"
| April  24 || North Carolina || #20 || Doug Kingsmore Stadium • Clemson, South Carolina || Frederick (1–1) || Morin (5–2) || Lamb (1) || style="text-align:center;" | 5,118 || W 10–6 || 25–15 (11–9)
|- align="left" bgcolor="#ffdddd"
| April  25 || North Carolina || #20 || Doug Kingsmore Stadium • Clemson, South Carolina || Johnson (4–3) || Lamb (3–4) || Holt (3) || style="text-align:center;" | 4,777 || L 3–4 || 25–16 (11–10)
|- align="left" bgcolor="#ffdddd"
| May 1* || Florida Gulf Coast || #25 || Doug Kingsmore Stadium • Clemson, South Carolina || Sale (7–0) || Haselden (4–4) || Wagoner (8) || style="text-align:center;" | 4,017 || L 2–4 || 25–17
|- align="left" bgcolor="#ddffdd"
| rowspan=2|May 2* || Florida Gulf Coast || #25 || Doug Kingsmore Stadium • Clemson, South Carolina || Weisman (4–2) || Erath (5–2) || Cruz (2) || rowspan=2 style="text-align:center;"| 4,745 || W 9–3 || 26–17
|- align="left" bgcolor="#ddffdd"
| Florida Gulf Coast || #25 || Doug Kingsmore Stadium • Clemson, South Carolina || Frederick (2–1) || Barners (2–2) ||  || W 7–6 || 27–17
|- align="left" bgcolor="#ddffdd"
| May 4* || Florida Gulf Coast || #24 || Doug Kingsmore Stadium • Clemson, South Carolina || Frederick (3–1) || Nathanson (4–3) ||  || style="text-align:center;" | 4,056 || W 14–2 || 28–17
|- align="left" bgcolor="#ddffdd"
| May 7 || @ Maryland || #24 || Shipley Field • College Park, Maryland || Harman (6–1) || B. Harman (4–8) ||  || style="text-align:center;" | 541 || W 18–6 || 29–17 (12–10)
|- align="left" bgcolor="#ddffdd"
| May 8 || @ Maryland || #24 || Shipley Field • College Park, Maryland || Frederick (4–1) || Dischert (0–1) ||  || style="text-align:center;" | 908 || W 12–8 || 30–17 (13–10)
|- align="left" bgcolor="#ddffdd"
| May 9 || @ Maryland || #24 || Shipley Field • College Park, Maryland || Cruz (3–2) || Kolarek (1–3) ||  || style="text-align:center;" |  517 || W 7–5 || 31–17 (14–10)
|- align="left" bgcolor="#ddffdd"
| May 11* || vs. Furman || #22 || Fluor Field at the West End • Greenville, South Carolina || Firth (1–1) || Benton (0–5) ||  || style="text-align:center;" | 3,417 || W 12–1 || 32–17
|- align="left" bgcolor="#ffdddd"
| May 14 || @ Wake Forest || #22 || Gene Hooks Field • Winston-Salem, North Carolina, || Stadler (3–3) || Harman (6–2) ||  || style="text-align:center;" | 803 || L 5–9 || 32–18 (14–11)
|- align="left" bgcolor="#ddffdd"
| May 15 || @ Wake Forest || #22 || Gene Hooks Field • Winston-Salem, North Carolina || Weisman (5–2) || Dimock (2–9) ||  || style="text-align:center;" | 679 || W 17–5 || 33–18 (15–11)
|- align="left" bgcolor="#ffdddd"
| May 16 || @ Wake Forest || #22 || Gene Hooks Field • Winston-Salem, North Carolina || Cooney (4–6) || Leone (2–1) ||  || style="text-align:center;" | 802 || L 2–11 || 33–19 (15–12)
|- align="left" bgcolor="#ddffdd"
| May 18* || Presbyterian || #22 || Doug Kingsmore Stadium • Clemson, South Carolina || Firth (2–1) || Harmon (2–8) ||  || style="text-align:center;" | 3,968 || W 8–2 || 34–19
|- align="left" bgcolor="#ddffdd"
| May 20 || #8 Florida State || #22 || Doug Kingsmore Stadium • Clemson, South Carolina || Frederick (5–1) || Parker (3–1) || Cruz (3) || style="text-align:center;" | 4,181 || W 9–8 || 35–19 (16–12)
|- align="left" bgcolor="#ddffdd"
| May 21 || #8 Florida State || #22 || Doug Kingsmore Stadium • Clemson, South Carolina || Weisman (6–2) || Busch (4–1) ||  || style="text-align:center;" | 4,495 || W 8–4 || 36–19 (17–12)
|- align="left" bgcolor="#ddffdd"
| May 22 || #8 Florida State || #22 || Doug Kingsmore Stadium • Clemson, South Carolina || Frederick (6–1) || Gast (6–3) ||  || style="text-align:center;" | 5,108 || W 8–3 || 37–19 (18–12)
|- align="left"
| colspan=11|*Non-Conference Game. #Rankings from ESPN/USA Today Coaches Poll. 1Note that rankings above 25 are not official rankings. They are representations of ranking based on the number of points received in the weekly poll.
|-

|- align="left" bgcolor="#ffdddd"
|May 26 || vs. #7 N.C. State || style="text-align:center;" | #2 || NewBridge Bank Park • Greensboro, North Carolina, || Sogard (2–2) || Frederick (6–2) ||  || style="text-align:center;" | 4,893 || L 8–13 || 37–20 (0–1)
|- align="left" bgcolor="#ffdddd"
|May 28 || vs. #6 Virginia Tech || style="text-align:center;" | #2 || NewBridge Bank Park • Greensboro, North Carolina || Rowen (5–1) || Kyle (0–1) ||  || style="text-align:center;" | 3,419 || L 8–9 || 37–21 (0–2)
|- align="left" bgcolor="#ddffdd"
|May 29 || vs. #3 Georgia Tech || style="text-align:center;" | #2 || NewBridge Bank Park • Greensboro, North Carolina || Lamb (4–4) || Bradley (9–4) ||  || style="text-align:center;" | 3,725 || W 9–3 || 38–21 (1–2)
|- align="left"
| colspan=11|#Rankings indicate tournament seeds
|-

|- align="left" bgcolor="#ddffdd"
|June 4 || #3 Southern Miss || style="text-align:center;" | #2 || Plainsman Park • Auburn, Alabama|| Weisman (7–2) || Copeland (11–1) ||  || style="text-align:center;" | 2,875 || W 10–1 || 39–21 (1–0)
|- align="left" bgcolor="#ddffdd"
|June 5 || #1 Auburn || style="text-align:center;" | #2 || Plainsman Park • Auburn, Alabama || Harman (7–2) || Dayton (8–3) ||  || style="text-align:center;" | 4,096 || W 5–2 || 40–21 (2–0)
|- align="left" bgcolor="#ffdddd"
|June 6 || #1 Auburn || style="text-align:center;" | #2 || Plainsman Park • Auburn, Alabama || Hubbard (6–2) || Cruz (3–3) ||  || style="text-align:center;" | 3,326 || L 10–11 || 40–22 (2–1)
|- align="left" bgcolor="#ddffdd"
|June 7 || #1 Auburn || style="text-align:center;" | #2 || Plainsman Park • Auburn, Alabama || Frederick (7–2) || Jacobs (0–2) || Brady (1) || style="text-align:center;" | 4,096 || W 13–7 ||  41–22 (3–1)
|- align="left"
| colspan=11|#Rankings indicate regional seeds
|-

|- align="left" bgcolor="#ffdddd"
|June 12 || Alabama ||  || Doug Kingsmore Stadium • Clemson, South Carolina || Nelson (9–3) || Harman (7–3) || Smith (6) || style="text-align:center;" | 6,346 || L 4–5 || 41–23 (3–2)
|- align="left" bgcolor="#ddffdd"
|June 13 || Alabama||  || Doug Kingsmore Stadium • Clemson, South Carolina || Weisman (8–2) || Morgan (7–5) ||  || style="text-align:center;" | 6,024 || W 19–5 || 42–23 (4–2)
|- align="left" bgcolor="#ddffdd"
|June 14 || Alabama||  || Doug Kingsmore Stadium • Clemson, South Carolina || Leone (3–1) || Kilcrease (8–3) || Lamb (2) || style="text-align:center;" | 5,250 || W 8–6 || 43–23 (5–2)
|- align="left"
| colspan=11|#Rankings indicate national seeds
|-

|- align="left" bgcolor="#ddffdd"
|June 21 || #1 Arizona State ||  || Rosenblatt Stadium • Omaha, Nebraska|| Harman (8–3) || Blair (12–1) || Frederick (3) || style="text-align:center;" | 14,198 || W 6–3 || 44–23 (6–2)
|- align="left" bgcolor="#ddffdd"
|June 22 || Oklahoma ||  || Rosenblatt Stadium • Omaha, Nebraska || Weisman (9–2) || Shore (10–5) || Frederick (4) || style="text-align:center;" | 21,527 || W 6–4 || 45–23 (7–2)
|- align="left" bgcolor="#ffdddd"
|June 25 || South Carolina ||  || Rosenblatt Stadium • Omaha, Nebraska || Roth (2–1) || Leone (3–2) ||  || style="text-align:center;" | 22,334 || L 1–5 || 45–24 (7–3)
|- align="left" bgcolor="#ffdddd"
|June 26 || South Carolina ||  || Rosenblatt Stadium • Omaha, Nebraska ||  ||  ||  ||  ||  || 45–25 (7–4)
|- align="left"
| colspan=11|#Rankings indicate national seeds
|-

References 

 http://clemsontigers.cstv.com/sports/m-basebl/spec-rel/102009aab.html

Clemson Tigers baseball seasons
Clemson Tigers Baseball Team, 2010
Clemson baseball
College World Series seasons
Clemson